Syomin (masculine) or Syomina (feminine), alternatively spelled Semin/Semina, is a Russian surname that is derived from Syoma, a diminutive of the male given name Semyon, and literally means Syoma's. It may refer to:

 Aleksandr Syomin (footballer) (1943–2016), retired Soviet association football player
 Alexander Semin (Aleksandr Syomin; born 1984), professional ice hockey player
 Andrei Syomin (born 1969), Russian association football coach
 Anna Syomina (born 1979), birth name of Yuta, Russian singer and songwriter
 Dmitri Semin (Dmitry Syomin; born 1983), Russian ice hockey player
 Konstantin Syomin (born 1980), Russian journalist and TV anchor
 Oleg Syomin (born 1974), retired Russian association football player
 Tamara Syomina (born 1938), Soviet film actress
 Yuri Semin (Yury Syomin; born 1947), Russian association football coach

See also
 Semin (disambiguation)